The 2005 FIBA Europe Under-18 Championship for Women was an international basketball  competition held in Hungary.

Final ranking

1.  Serbia and Montenegro

2.  Spain

3.  France

4.  Czech Republic

5.  Russia

6.  Hungary

7.  Lithuania

8.  Slovakia

9.  Germany

10.  Turkey

11.  Belgium

12.  Bulgaria

13.  Poland

14.  Greece

15.  Croatia

16.  Italy

Awards

External links
FIBA Archive

FIBA U18 Women's European Championship
2004–05 in European basketball
2004–05 in Hungarian basketball
International youth basketball competitions hosted by Hungary